was a Japanese record label within the company, King Records that primarily dealt with anime, voice acting, live action movies and dramas from 1981 to 2016. As an internal brand of King Records, it wielded a strong influence over fans with the help of popular singers and voice actors like Megumi Hayashibara and Nana Mizuki.

The company was succeeded by King's new company King Amusement Creative since 2016.

See also
King Records 3rd Creativity Division, the former anime-related division of King Records
Gansis, an anime production company closely related to King Records

References

External links
 

1981 establishments in Japan
2016 disestablishments in Japan
Defunct record labels of Japan